Alkaleri is a Local Government Area of Bauchi State, Nigeria. Its headquarters are in the town of Alkaleri (or Alkalere) on the A345 highway in the north of the area at.
The northeasterly line of equal latitude and longitude passes through the LGA.

It has an area of 5,918 km2 and a population of 329,424 at the 2006 census.

The predominant ethnic group in the area are the Fulani, Kanuri, Dugurawa, Guruntawa and Labur "Jaku" people.

The postal code of the area is 743.

Districts
The districts of the local government are Pali, Duguri, and Gwana. Major towns and villages of the local government like Fanti, Gar, Gokaru, Guma, Gwaram etc. including the local government headquarters, Alkaleri are located in the Pali district.

Duguri district is the home to Yankari -West Africa's premier game reserve, and consists of towns and villages like Badara, Dagudi, Dan, Gajin Duguri, Mainamaji, Yashi, Yelwan Duguri, and the historic Duguri.

Gwana is located in the southeastern part of the local government.

References

Local Government Areas in Bauchi State